Amblève may refer to:

 Amblève (river) in Belgium
 Amel, a town in Belgium, called Amblève in French